The GF World Cup '10 was held in Århus, Denmark on September 21-26. It was an invitational women's handball tournament organized by the Danish Handball Association.

The tournament is said to be the world's most prestigious non-IHF tournament for women. Romania was the last winner of GF World Cup, after beating Norway in the last year final, 28–27. In the same exact final Romania again had the better end by defeating Norway 24–23.

Competition

Group A 

All times are Central European Summer Time (UTC+2)

Group B 

All times are Central European Summer Time (UTC+2)

Knockout stage

Semifinals

Bronze medal match

Final

All-Star Team 
Goalkeeper:  Katrine Lunde
Left Wing:  Valentina Ardean-Elisei
Left Back:  Cristina Neagu
Center Back:  Anita Görbicz
Right Back:  Camilla Dalby
Right Wing:  Linn-Kristin Riegelhuth
Line Player:  Marit Malm Frafjord
MVP:  Cristina Neagu

External links
 GF World Cup 2010 Site

2010 in handball
2010 in Danish sport
GF World Cup
International handball competitions hosted by Denmark